Terry and Julian is a British sitcom that aired on Channel 4 in 1992. Starring Julian Clary, it was written by Clary, Paul Merton and John Henderson. The title of the series spoofs the name of the long-running BBC sitcom Terry and June, whose stars June Whitfield and Reginald Marsh made a guest appearance in episode five, Terry's Safe Deposit, playing characters named George and Mildred (in homage to the Thames Television sitcom George and Mildred).

Cast
Julian Clary – Julian
Lee Simpson – Terry Biggins
Kate Lonergan – Rene

Guest Stars
Paul Merton - Vicar
June Whitfield - Mildred Wilson
Reginald Marsh - George Wilson
Gordon Honeycombe - News Reader

Plot
Terry Biggins, an average, heterosexual man, advertises for a lodger for his flat in Streatham and Julian, a flamboyant gay Channel 4 celebrity moves in. Julian soon disrupts Terry's mundane life, turns the flat into something similar to an 18th-century Turkish boudoir and disrupts Terry's relationship with his girlfriend, policewoman Rene.

Unusually for a sitcom, Terry and Julian breaks the "fourth wall" by recognising the studio audience and viewers, and employs use of audience participation.

Episodes
"Enter Julian" (11 September 1992)
"Get Thee Behind Me" (18 September 1992)
"Julian Slips Out" (25 September 1992)
"The Other Side of Julian" (2 October 1992)
"Julian's Safe Deposit" (9 October 1992)
"Spain" (16 October 1992)

References
Mark Lewisohn, "Radio Times Guide to TV Comedy", BBC Worldwide Ltd, 2003
Terry and Julian at British TV Comedy

External links 
 
 Terry and Julian at British TV Comedy
 
 

1990s British sitcoms
1992 British television series debuts
1992 British television series endings
1990s British LGBT-related television series
Channel 4 sitcoms
English-language television shows
Television shows set in London